Antonio Valeriano (c. 1521–1605) was a colonial Mexican, Nahua scholar and politician. He was a collaborator with fray Bernardino de Sahagún in the creation of the twelve-volume General History of the Things of New Spain, the Florentine Codex, He served as judge-governor of both his home, Azcapotzalco, and of Tenochtitlan, in Spanish colonial New Spain.

Career
Antonio de Valeriano was the most accomplished pupil and then native scholar at the Franciscan Colegio de Santa Cruz de Tlatelolco. As with other students at the colegio, Valeriano was taught literacy in Nahuatl, Spanish, and Latin.  Bernardino de Sahagún singled out Valeriano as "one of my collaborators ... collegians expert in grammar. The principal and most learned of them was Antonio de Valeriano of Atzcapoltzalco."  He was also praised by Franciscan Fray Juan Bautista, who preserved the last letter that Valeriano wrote him in Latin. Valeriano says that "my hands are trembling, my eyes are clouded, and my ears closed" and signing as "Your most loving, but unworthy, Antonius Valerianus" ).

Valeriano and other pupils and former pupils of the colegio are to be credited with their collaboration with the Franciscans in creating religious texts, dictionaries, and other texts such as Sahagún's magnum opus of the General History of the Things of New Spain, the Florentine Codex.

Position in Tenochtitlan 
Valeriano served as judge-governor of San Juan Tenochtitlan, the former capital of the Aztec Empire, from 1573 to 1599. The city had only recently begun to be ruled by non-dynastic governors, its governors often having been descendants of the old Aztec emperors until the death of Luis de Santa María Nanacacipactzin in 1565. These dynastic governors used the old royal title tlatoani; beginning with Valeriano's predecessor Francisco Jiménez, governors of the city were simply called juez-gobernador. Though not noble himself, Valeriano was of Nahua origin and was connected to the previous royal dynasty through marrying a daughter of the tlatoani and governor Diego de Alvarado Huanitzin.

As judge-governor, Valeriano operated between two worlds; he spoke both Spanish and Nahuatl and served as both a preserver and destroyer of the pre-colonial culture. He dressed as a Spaniard, but artistic depictions of him varied. Some depicted him the same as the other judge-governors. It also appears that some in Tenochtitlan saw Valeriano as almost a tlatoani, since he in one depiction in the Aubin Codex is shown with a crown and seated on a throne. The depiction differs from how the same codex depicts the tlatoani however, in that he is shown with a brown Spanish shirt rather than Nahua attire and that he is holding a staff of justice (symbolizing his role as judge).

Question of authorship of the Nican Mopohua
The question of Valeriano's authorship of the Nahuatl text known as Nican Mopohua has become a point of contention in the long-running dispute over the historicity of the apparitions of the Virgin Mary (under the title Our Lady of Guadalupe) to Juan Diego in 1531.  The Nican Mopohua was published in 1649 by Luis Laso de la Vega as part of a composite text known from its opening words as the Huei tlamahuiçoltica, and de la Vega's claims of authorship in the preface to that work notwithstanding, the Nican Mopohua has long been attributed to Valeriano.  This attribution is based on a tradition dating back to the Informaciones Jurídicas de 1666 and the assertions of Luis Becerra Tanco and, subsequently, Don Carlos de Sigüenza y Góngora as to Valeriano's authorship and as to their acquaintance with the relative manuscripts in his hand-writing.

Suggestions have been made that its content is incompatible with someone (such as Valeriano) who had close bonds with the Franciscans, and others have suggested that the Huei tlamahuiçoltica is a unitary work which – despite the considerable objections against such a possibility – de la Vega wrote, with the assistance of a collaborator. Nevertheless, the general consensus among Mexican scholars (ecclesiastical and secular) remains that Valeriano is indeed the author of the Nican Mopohua.

See also
Crónica Mexicayotl
Fernando Alvarado Tezozómoc

Notes

References

Castañeda de la Paz, María, "Historia de una casa real. Origen y ocaso del linaje gobernante en México-Tenochtitlan", Nuevo Mundo Mundos Nuevos [online].  Article online since 31 January 2011, accessed 21 December 2013 

Traslosheros, Jorge E. (2009). "Guadalupan Voices in the History of Mexico" presentation to Marian Congress 6–8 August 2009 Phoenix, Arizona, accessed 2011-02-02

|-

Nahua people
Historians of Mesoamerica
Governors of San Juan Tenochtitlan
Nahuatl-language writers
Novohispanic Mesoamericanists
16th-century Mesoamericanists
16th-century Mexican historians
16th-century indigenous people of the Americas
1520s births
1605 deaths
Classical Nahuatl
16th-century Latin-language writers